The chestnut rail (Eulabeornis castaneoventris) is a species of bird in the family Rallidae. It is the only species in the genus Eulabeornis.
It is found in the Aru Islands and northern Australia.
Its natural habitat is subtropical or tropical mangrove forests.

References

chestnut rail
Birds of the Aru Islands
Birds of the Northern Territory
chestnut rail
Taxonomy articles created by Polbot